Dreams Never Die is the fourth studio album by Tiffany, released on November 21, 1993 (see 1993 in music).  It represented an attempt to return to pop success three years after her last album, and five years after her last commercially successful one.  It was released in various countries of Asia, but not in the United States; she had retained a greater degree of popularity in Asia than in the United States.  An American release was planned but never released; it was expected to have some changes from the Asian version, because, as Tiffany said at the time, "A lot of the stuff in the Asia market is a little more pop than what I want to do here.  I want to break away from the bubble gum thing... My goal is to do not hard rock, but a semi-rock sound."  Earlier in 1993, Tiffany (who was by then married to makeup artist Bulmaro "Junior" Garcia and had given birth to her son Elijah) gave a series of performances at the Las Vegas Hilton's casino lounge, which included songs from this album.

This album was produced by Tiffany's former manager, George Tobin, with whom she had earlier split, and who had been widely criticized for his exploitative management style, but also widely credited for achieving Tiffany's pop success.  However, this business relationship soon soured; according to Tiffany, this happened when she discovered that the songs Tobin had given her to sing on this album were previously used by another Tobin act, PC Quest. Tiffany and Tobin went their separate ways, with Tiffany moving to Nashville and attempting a career as a country singer; this, however, never led to any record releases, and by 2000 she was back to pop music. Tiffany eventually recorded her first country album, Rose Tattoo, released 11 years later.

Track listing

Personnel

Musicians
John Duarte - keyboards
Bret Zwier - drums
Grant Geissman - guitar
Kevin Dukes - guitar
Keith Howland - guitar
Monty Byrom - guitar
Doug Livingston - steel guitar 
Drew Nichols - acoustic guitar

Background vocals
Tiffany
Aaron Sheppard
Brian Sheppard
Kevin Sheppard
Terry Wood
Chad Petree
Steve Petree

References

1993 albums
Tiffany Darwish albums
MCA Records albums